Samito is a Mozambican-Canadian musician and overall creative who founded Fezihaus, a Montréal-based creative company, in 2020. His growing work is described as "entrenched in an unwavering enthusiasm for sounds and all-embracing conversations of the now." 

A music graduate from McGill University, Samito first came to public attention in 2016 with his song Tiku La Hina propelling him into live stages at SXSW, Osheaga, Pop Montreal, MAMA Festival & Convention, Reeperbahn, and Festival d'été de Québec, among others. 2016 also saw the release of Cem Cem (feat. Mabika & Muneshine) on French lifestyle brand and music label Kitsuné. In 2017, he followed with I Saw You, an electro-inspired club song released with Berlin-based label Man Recordings. His music is primarily sung in Portuguese.

Career 
Born in Maputo, Mozambique, Samito moved to Montréal in 2005, to pursue his studies and later a career in music. In Montréal, he collaborated with SPRLUA, Rymz, Arthur Comeau, Philippe Brault, Radio Radio, Pierre Kwenders Poirier, among others.

Samito was  one of Radio Canada's 2015-2016 upcoming artist of the year.

On May 27, 2016, he released his debut album, the self-titled Samito. The single Tiku la Hina was released, with an accompanying music video broadcast on Canadian music channels Much and MusiquePlus. The album was awarded the 2017 Félix Award for World Music Album Of The Year at Québec's Gala De L’ADISQ. 

Samito's credits and collaborations include Gotan Project's Philippe Cohen-Solal, Daniel Haaksman, Dakat, Muneshine and Pierre Kwenders.

Discography

Albums

Singles / Videos
2016: "Tiku la hina" 
2016: "Cem Cem" 
2017: "I Saw You"

References

External links
Official website

Black Canadian musicians
Canadian electronic musicians
Canadian world music musicians
Mozambican emigrants to Canada
Canadian people of Mozambican descent
21st-century Mozambican male singers
Musicians from Montreal